NGC 5247 is a face-on unbarred spiral galaxy located some 60 million light years away in the constellation Virgo. It is a member of the Virgo II Groups, a series of galaxies and galaxy clusters strung out from the southern edge of the Virgo Supercluster. This is a grand design spiral galaxy that displays no indications of distortion caused by interaction with other galaxies. It has two spiral arms that bifurcate after wrapping halfway around the nucleus. The disk is estimated to be  in thickness and it is inclined by roughly 28° to the line of sight.

References

External links
 
 

Unbarred spiral galaxies
Virgo (constellation)
5247
48171
UGCA objects